The following lists events that happened during 2001 in Chile.

Incumbents
President of Chile: Ricardo Lagos

Events

December
16 December – Chilean parliamentary election, 2001

Deaths
2 January – Santos Chavez (b. 1934)
28 May – Francisco Varela (b. 1946)
8 December – Augusto Barcia (b. 1926)

References 

 
Years of the 21st century in Chile
Chile